Meshir 4 - Coptic Calendar - Meshir 6

The fifth day of the Coptic month of Meshir, the sixth month of the Coptic year. On a common year, this day corresponds to January 30, of the Julian Calendar, and February 12, of the Gregorian Calendar. This day falls in the Coptic Season of Shemu, the season of the Harvest.

Commemorations

Martyrs 

 The martyrdom of Pope Hippolytus, Patriarch of Rome

Saints 

 The departure of Pope Agrippinus, the 10th Patriarch of the See of Saint Mark 
 The departure of Saint Pishay, the founder of the Red Monastery
 The departure of Saint Apollo, the friend of Saint Abib 
 The departure of Saint Abanoub, the owner of the Golden Fan

Other commemorations 

 The relocation of the Relics of Forty-Nine Elders, the Martyrs of Scetis

References 

Days of the Coptic calendar